Mary D'Souza Sequeira (born 18 July 1931) is an Indian female Olympian who competed internationally in track and field and field hockey.  She competed in the women's 100 and 200 metres at the 1952 Summer Olympics.  D'Souza won a bronze medal in the 200 metres and a silver medal in the  relay at the 1951 Asian Games with Pat Mendonca  (her cousin), Banoo Gulzar and Roshan Mistry.

D'Souza won a gold medal in the 1954 Asian Games in Manila in the  relay, with Stephie D'Souza, Violet Peters and Christine Brown in a time of 49.5 seconds. She held the Asian records in 100 and 200 meters in 1956. She was selected to go to the Melbourne Olympics, but the Indian Government said they had no funds for a women's team. She is the first Indian double international. She played field hockey for India in 1953 in Folkestone, England, in 1956 in Australia, in the IWFHA International Tournament and in test matches vs Japan and Ceylon.

Career
In 1951, D'Souza competed in the First Asian Games in New Delhi, winning a silver medal in the 4x100 meter relay and a bronze in the 200 meters. First Indian Female Team Asian Games. In the Second Asian Games in Manila in 1954 she won  a gold medal in the 4x100 meter relay. 1954 Asian Games medal table First Indian Female Gold Medal Asian Games. She set Indian national records in track and field from 1951 to 1957 100 meters, 200 meters and 80m hurdles. She was the Asian record holder with 12.3 seconds over 100 meters and 12.5 seconds over 200 meters. She was the first female track and field contingent to go to the Olympics from India in 1952. She competed in the 100m and 200m.

She was a field hockey player with India's first women's field hockey team, in the First IFWHA International Women's Field Hockey World Tournament in Folkestone, UK, 1953  In 1956 she represented India at the Australian International Women's Field Hockey Tournament. She was the top scorer for India in goals in the tournament. She played India vs Ceylon matches, as right winger assisted in both goals

She was elected to represent India at the 1956 Summer Olympics, but did not go as India did not pay for female athletes to go. She was with the Indian team that played in the Prime Ministers Defense Fund Field Hockey Tour in 1961. She also took part in the India vs Ceylon (Sri Lanka) field hockey tour in India and the India vs Japan field hockey test matches touring India in 1964

She was an Indian Railways sports officer who coached and recruited sportspeople for Indian Railways teams and conducted Inter Railway Tournaments. She was also a district commissioners with the Girl Guides(Scouts). She earned the Dhyan Chand Award in 2013 from the Government of India.

References

External links
 

1931 births
Living people
Indian female field hockey players
Indian female sprinters
20th-century Indian women
20th-century Indian people
Sportswomen from Goa
Recipients of the Dhyan Chand Award
Field hockey players from Goa
Athletes from Goa
Athletes (track and field) at the 1952 Summer Olympics
Olympic athletes of India
Asian Games medalists in athletics (track and field)
Athletes (track and field) at the 1951 Asian Games
Athletes (track and field) at the 1954 Asian Games
Asian Games gold medalists for India
Asian Games silver medalists for India
Asian Games bronze medalists for India
Medalists at the 1951 Asian Games
Medalists at the 1954 Asian Games